also referred to as  in the US and UK dubbed versions outside of Japan. Tsurugi is a martial arts expert and a professional mercenary for hire in The Street Fighter film trilogy, played by Japanese actor Sonny Chiba. As opposed to the many heroic protagonists portrayed in the chopsocky boom of the 1970s, Tsurugi is an amoral antihero who is not above committing wicked deeds in exchange for monetary rewards, although he possesses a strong sense of justice nonetheless.

Fictional biography
Takuma Tsurugi was born to a Japanese father and a Chinese mother in 1939. In 1944 during the Second Sino-Japanese War, a five-year-old Tsurugi received martial arts training from his father, who had perfected his own unique hybrid-martial art known as Satsujin-ken (殺人拳, lit. "killer fist") which is Karate fused with Kung-Fu. Tsurigi's father was tried and convicted of treason by the Japanese government due to his marriage to a Chinese woman, a charge based solely on racial prejudice. Despite his oaths of loyalty to the Japanese Empire, Tsurugi's father was executed by firing squad, an event that Tsurugi witnessed. The traumatic event proved to be the formative moment of Tsurugi's young life, causing him to grow up as a distrustful, amoral mercenary living only to prove his own fighting abilities which is from there on thirty years later in his life in 1974. Tsurugi has little in the way of a moral code, and will resort to any means necessary to collect on debts owed to him, including selling his debtors' family into sexual slavery.

Skills and abilities
Like his father, Takuma is a black-belt of the traditional arts of Karate and Kung-Fu. As a skilled assassin, he possesses intense fighting abilities who ferociously dispense brutal and deadly bodily harm towards his enemies. However, he has no qualms about fighting dirty either, hence his given title The Street Fighter. He has poked peoples eyes, cracked their necks by stomping on them with side of his shoe, and even castrating an assailant predator by grasping and tearing off his genitals single-handedly in under one second. He also has strength, agility, and reflexes that Bruce Lee's abilities almost matches with. On multiple occasions, he has fractured skulls from a single punch to the victim's head and has injured a man by ripping out his throat. He holds an incredible resilience to inflicted injuries, capable of withstanding from a bullet shot to his back and a stab wound in the abdomen all together.

While he tends to engage in hand-to-hand combat with his enemies, he is also proficient in many Japanese weaponry arts including the sai and throwing knives. On the field, he distinctly dons a black karategi; a bronze leather belt wrapped around the jacket of his gi, rather than a traditional obi (belt); completed with a pair of white socks inside of black jump boots; his regular weapon of choice is his pair of brown han kote (samurai gauntlets) with steel armor to ward off blade-wielding foes, deliver fatal forearm blows, and to conceal several kunais. He may also use disguises to infiltrate and reach his target undetected. He is usually wearing a black M-1965 field jacket.

References

External links
 Grindhouse Cinema Database: Terry Tsurugi
 10K Bullets review of The Street Fighter trilogy

Action film characters
Fictional orphans
Fictional bodyguards
Fictional assassins
Fictional mass murderers
Fictional mercenaries
Fictional Japanese people
Fictional Han people
Fictional karateka
Fictional Shaolin kung fu practitioners
Fictional kenpō practitioners
Fictional Ninjutsu practitioners
Fictional judoka
Fictional jujutsuka
Fictional sanshou practitioners
Film characters introduced in 1974
Martial artist characters in films
The Street Fighter